The mayor of Kansas City, Kansas is the highest official of the city government. In 1997, voters approved the consolidation of the Kansas City, Kansas government with that of Wyandotte County. The office has since been referred to as "mayor/CEO" of the "United Government of Wyandotte County and Kansas City, Kansas." However, in popular terms, the head executive is called the mayor.

The following is a list of mayors of the city and the original towns that were consolidated into it.

List of mayors

Mayors elected before the 1886 consolidation

Mayors elected after the 1886 consolidation

Mayors elected after consolidation with Wyandotte County

Notes

See also

 List of mayors of Kansas City, Missouri
 Lists of people from Kansas

References

Kansas City, Kansas
 Mayors